George Magulick (1919-1955) was a professional football player in the National Football League. He played in only one season (1944) for "Card-Pitt", a team that was the result of a temporary merger between the Chicago Cardinals and the Pittsburgh Steelers. The teams' merger was a result of the manning shortages experienced league-wide due to World War II. He graduated from Saint Francis University in 1943. His nickname was "Skinny". He died on January 8, 1955.
He is buried in the old section of the Saint Stanislaus Kostka Cemetery, Barnesboro, Cambria County, Pennsylvania.

References

Notes
 

1919 births
Players of American football from Pennsylvania
Card-Pitt players
Saint Francis University alumni
Saint Francis Red Flash football players
1955 deaths
People from Cambria County, Pennsylvania